Dimitrija Lazarevski (born 23 September 1982 in Skopje) is a retired footballer from the Republic of Macedonia who last played as a defender for FK Shkupi.

Club career
He previously played with Serbian side FK Zemun, Croatian NK Kamen Ingrad, Belgian FCV Dender EH, and other Macedonian clubs such as FK Makedonija Gjorče Petrov, FK Renova and FK Rabotnički Kometal.

International career
Lazarevski represented Macedonia in U-16, U-18 and U-21 levels.

References

External links
 Profile at Macedonian Football 

1982 births
Living people
Footballers from Skopje
Association football fullbacks
Macedonian footballers
North Macedonia youth international footballers
North Macedonia under-21 international footballers
FK Rabotnički players
FK Zemun players
FK Makedonija Gjorče Petrov players
NK Kamen Ingrad players
FK Renova players
F.C.V. Dender E.H. players
FK Metalurg Skopje players
Besa Kavajë players
FC Astana players
FK Vardar players
FK Shkupi players
Macedonian First Football League players
First League of Serbia and Montenegro players
Croatian Football League players
Belgian Pro League players
Kategoria Superiore players
Kazakhstan Premier League players
Macedonian expatriate footballers
Expatriate footballers in Serbia and Montenegro
Macedonian expatriate sportspeople in Serbia and Montenegro
Expatriate footballers in Croatia
Macedonian expatriate sportspeople in Croatia
Expatriate footballers in Belgium
Macedonian expatriate sportspeople in Belgium
Expatriate footballers in Albania
Macedonian expatriate sportspeople in Albania
Expatriate footballers in Kazakhstan
Macedonian expatriate sportspeople in Kazakhstan